Liam Teague (born in 1974) is a Trinidadian composer, arranger, and steelpan performer.

Life 
Teague was born in Trinidad and Tobago in 1974. He attended Northern Illinois University in the US, where he earned his bachelor's degree in music (1997), as well as his master's degree in music (1999). He currently works as a professor at Northern Illinois University, where he teaches music and serves as the Chair of Steelpan Studies.

Discography 

 1993 Hands Like Lightning (Engine Room Recording)
 1996 Emotions of Steel (Engine Room Recording)
 2000 T'NT (Sack Records)
 2010 Open Window (Rhythmic Union Records)

Awards and honours 

 Steel Band Professor and Director at Northern Illinois University
 Winner of the Trinidad and Tobago National Steelband Festival Solo Championship
 Winner of the Saint Louis Symphony Volunteers Association Young Artist Competition
 Appeared in concert with Grammy-nominated musicians Paquito D'Rivera, Dave Samuels, Zakir Hussain and Dame Evelyn Glennie.
 Awarded national honour of the Hummingbird Medal (Silver)
Anthony N. Sabga Caribbean Award for Excellence
Received keys to the City of San Fernando

References

Steel (band) members
1975 births
Living people